Nasrollahabad may refer to:
 Nasrollahabad, Fuman, Gilan Province
 Nasrollahabad, Rasht, Gilan Province
 Nasrollahabad, Ilam
 Nasrollahabad, Khuzestan